The Lăzești is a left tributary of the river Neagra in Romania. It discharges into the Neagra near Popeștii de Jos.

References

Rivers of Romania
Rivers of Alba County